The Styrian Farmers' Party was a political party in Austria.

History
The only election contested by the party was the 1919 Constitutional Assembly elections, in which it received 1.6% of the national vote and won three seats. The party did not contest the elections the following year.

References

Defunct political parties in Austria
Agrarian parties in Austria
Defunct liberal political parties in Austria
German nationalism in Austria
German nationalist political parties
National liberal parties
Nationalist parties in Austria